Darren Tillis (born February 23, 1960) is an American retired professional basketball player who was selected by the Boston Celtics in the first round (23rd pick overall) of the 1982 NBA Draft. A 6'11" center born in Dallas, Texas Tillis spent his college career at Cleveland State University. He then played two full NBA seasons, for the Celtics, Cleveland Cavaliers and Golden State Warriors.

In his NBA career, Tillis played in 124 games and scored a total of 425 points.

External links
http://www.thedraftreview.com/index.php?option=com_content&view=article&id=2026

1960 births
Living people
American expatriate basketball people in Italy
American expatriate basketball people in Spain
Basketball players from Dallas
Boston Celtics draft picks
Boston Celtics players
Centers (basketball)
Clemson Tigers men's basketball coaches
Cleveland Cavaliers players
Cleveland State Vikings men's basketball players
Golden State Warriors players
Liga ACB players
Marshall Thundering Herd men's basketball coaches
San Jose Jammers players
SMU Mustangs men's basketball coaches
Sportspeople from Dallas
Tenerife AB players
UCF Knights men's basketball coaches
Wyoming Cowboys basketball coaches
American men's basketball players